WWF Full Metal: The Album is the first compilation album released by WWE (then known as the World Wrestling Federation, or WWF) in October 1995 by Edel Music. It features a selection of theme tunes of wrestlers on the roster at the time, and is considered to be Volume 1 of the WWE: The Music series. The album was reissued outside North America as WWF Champions: The Album – Full Metal Edition on September 24, 1996.

The album was named after the European WWF Full Metal Tour in October 1995, and commercials in Germany for the album were aired featuring Diesel and Razor Ramon.

Critical reception

Steve Huey awarded WWF Full Metal: The Album three stars out of five, calling it "the perfect supplement for hardcore fans."

Track listing
All songs were composed and performed by Jim Johnston (except as indicated via italics).
 "We're All Together Now" (performed by the WWF Superstars & Slam Jam)
 "Thorn in Your Eye" (performed by the WWF Superstars & Slam Jam)
 "Diesel Blues" (Diesel)
 "The Lyin' King" (King Mabel)
 "1-2-3" (1-2-3 Kid)
 "Goldust" (Goldust)
 "Smokin' " (The Smoking Gunns)
 "Psycho Dance" (Psycho Sid)
 "The Bad Guy" (Razor Ramon)
 "Hart Attack" (Bret Hart) (Jimmy Hart/John J. Maguire/Jim Johnston)
 "Angel" (Hakushi)
 "Graveyard Symphony" (The Undertaker)
 "Sexy Boy" (Shawn Michaels) (Jimmy Hart/John J. Maguire)
 "With My Baby Tonight" (Jeff Jarrett)

"With My Baby Tonight" was actually performed by Brian James, who wrestled in the WWF at the time as "The Roadie" (and later as "The Road Dogg" Jesse James). Jeff Jarrett lip-synched the song for his performance at In Your House 2: The Lumberjacks.

Slam Jam members
Vocals: Jon Oliva (Savatage/Trans-Siberian Orchestra) (on "We're All Together Now") 
Vocals: Michel Begeame and Olli Schneider (Such A Surge) (on "Thorn in Your Eye")
Guitar: Scott Ian (Anthrax)
Guitar: Kenny Hickey (Type O Negative)
Bass: Gary Meskil (Crumbsuckers/Pro Pain)
Drums: Tim Mallare (Overkill)

See also

Music in professional wrestling

References

WWE albums
Edel Music albums
1995 compilation albums
1995 soundtrack albums
Rock compilation albums
Rock soundtracks